Arimpur is a small village located in Thrissur District of Kerala, India. Thrissur is also known as the cultural capital of Kerala.

References

Villages in Thrissur district